Something About 1 Percent is a 2016 South Korean television series starring Ha Seok-jin and Jeon So-min. It is based on the novel of the same title, which was previously made into a television series in 2003. It was broadcast in South Korea, China, Japan and the United States. The drama was first aired on September 30, 2016 on Oksusu, a mobile broadcasting app owned by SK Telecom. The drama then was scheduled to air on Dramax on Wednesdays to Thursdays at 21:00 beginning October 5, 2016.

Plot
Lee Jae-in (Ha Seok-jin) is the ruthless heir of a wealthy family who has to get married in order to inherit his grandfather's fortune. Lee Jae-in engages in a six-month contract for a pretend relationship with Kim Da-hyun (Jeon So-min) an elementary school teacher chosen for him by his grandfather, the head of the family. The teacher doesn't realize, and the heir doesn't know, that the grandfather was the person the teacher had rescued when he collapsed outside her school.  So the pair get off to a rough start when the heir insists on dating and the teacher thinks he is a marriage scammer.  It takes a while but 'One Percent of Anything' is a romance drama about what happens when the pair discover their pretend relationship has gotten too real.

Cast

Main Cast
 Ha Seok-jin as Lee Jae-in, a third generation chaeboel heir who currently runs the SH hotel. He is arrogant and has a filthy mouth which brings him to clash constantly with his grandfather. He is strict and workaholic which earns him the wrath of Da-hyun , but after he falls in love with Da-hyun
 Jeon So-min as Kim Da-hyun, a simple school teacher who loves her job and is a kind lady. She unknowingly saves Jae-in's grandfather after which he includes her in his will in an attempt to teach Jae-in the morals of life,but after falls in love with Lee Jae-in.

Supporting cast

Jae-in's family 
 Joo Jin-mo as Lee Gyu-chul (Jae-in's grandfather), the chairman of the prestigious SH group who wants his grandson to learn the morals of a life instead of being a workaholic
 Lee Kan-hee as Kang Se-hee (Jae-in's mother). She adopted Jae-in after his father died in an accident. She loves him as her own and is supportive of his decisions
 Lee Hae-in as Soo-jung (Jae-in's half-sister) - She often runs away from home and finds herself falling for Ji-su. 
 Kim Hyung-min as Min Tae-ha (Jae-in's cousin)
 Kim Min-sang as Min Hyuk-joo (Tae-ha's father)
 Kim Si-young as Lee Soo-yeong (Tae-ha's mother)

People around Jae-in 
 Kim Sun-hyuk as Park Hyung-joon
 Seo Eun-chae as Han Joo-hee

Da-hyun's family 
 Lee Sang-hoon as Kim Jin-man (Da-hyun's father)
 Lee Young-sook as Jung Mi-jung (Da-hyun's mother)

People around Da-hyun 
 Baek Seung-heon as Ji-su
 Im Do-yoon as Jung Hyun-jin
 Choi Sung-jae as  Jung Sun-woo (Hyun-jin's half-brother)

SH Alpensia Hotel Staff 
 Jo Jae-ryong as Kang Dong-suk
 Park Jin-joo as Han Yoo-kyung
 Kim Doo-hee as Choi Chang-soo

Original soundtrack

Part 1

Ratings 
In the table below, the blue numbers represent the lowest ratings and the red numbers represent the highest ratings.

Production 
Filming began on June 6, 2016 and finished on August 16, 2016.

International broadcast
 In the Philippines, it was aired on GMA Network from December 3, 2018 to January 4, 2019.

Notes

References

External links
  

2016 South Korean television series debuts
Korean-language television shows
South Korean romantic comedy television series
Television shows based on South Korean novels
Television series by IHQ (company)
Dramax television dramas
Television series reboots